For the Boys: Music from the Motion Picture is the soundtrack to the feature film of the same name starring Bette Midler and James Caan, released on the Atlantic Records label in 1991.

In the movie Midler and Caan play the USO entertainers Dixie Leonard and Eddie Sparks who travel and perform together through World War II, the Korean War, and the Vietnam War and the soundtrack mainly consists of period music from the songbooks of Hoagy Carmichael, Ray Evans, Johnny Mercer, Harold Arlen, and Frank Loesser, including jazz standards and evergreens like "P.S. I Love You", "Stuff Like That There", "Come Rain or Come Shine", and Leonard and Sparks' signature tune "I Remember You". A few of the tracks performed by Midler and Caan were originals composed especially for the movie. "Dixie's Dream" was written by Midler's longtime collaborator Marc Shaiman; "Dreamland" by Alan and Marilyn Bergman and co-producer Dave Grusin; Grusin also wrote the Golden Globe nominated original score.

For the Boys was promoted by the Diane Warren-penned ballad "Every Road Leads Back To You" which became a Top 20 hit on the US adult contemporary chart, peaking at #15. The second single was Midler's interpretation of The Beatles "In My Life", in the movie performed by Dixie Leonard as she entertains the U.S. troops during the Vietnam War. "In My Life" also reached #20 on the adult contemporary chart and later made its way onto Midler's greatest hits collection Experience the Divine.

The For the Boys album reached #22 on the U.S. album chart, and was later certified Gold by the RIAA, and #75 in the UK.

Track listing
All tracks performed by Bette Midler unless otherwise noted

 "Billy-A-Dick" (Hoagy Carmichael, Paul Francis Webster) - 1:35
 "Stuff Like That There" (Ray Evans, Jay Livingston) - 2:50
 "P.S. I Love You" (Gordon Jenkins, Johnny Mercer) - 3:33
 "The Girlfriend of the Whirling Dervish" (Al Dubin, Johnny Mercer, Harry Warren) - 1:16
 Performed by the cast
 "I Remember You" / "Dixie's Dream" (Johnny Mercer, Victor Schertzinger) / (Marc Shaiman) - 2:21
 Performed by Bette Midler and James Caan
 "Baby, It's Cold Outside" (Frank Loesser) - 1:29
 Performed by Bette Midler and James Caan
 "Dreamland" (Alan Bergman, Marilyn Bergman, Don Grusin) - 3:16
 "Vickie and Mr. Valves" (Lenny LaCroix) - 2:29
 Performed by the cast, trumpet solo by Jack Sheldon
 "For All We Know" (J. Fred Coots, Sam M. Lewis) - 4:00
 "Come Rain or Come Shine" (Harold Arlen, Johnny Mercer) - 3:30
 "In My Life" (John Lennon, Paul McCartney) - 3:26
 "I Remember You" (Johnny Mercer, Victor Schertzinger) - 3:34
 "Every Road Leads Back to You" (Diane Warren) - 3:47

Personnel

 Bette Midler - lead vocals, backing vocals
 James Caan - lead vocals
 Melissa Manchester - backing vocals
 Morgan Ames - backing vocals
 Carmen Twillie - backing vocals  
 Eugene VanBuren - backing vocals
 Randy Crenshaw - backing vocals
 Patty d'Arcy - backing vocals  
 John West - backing vocals
 Kevin Dorsey - backing vocals
 Lorraine Feather - backing vocals
 Don Shelton - backing vocals
 Jo Ann Harris - backing vocals 
 Jon Joyce - backing vocals
 David Lasley - backing vocals
 Arnold McCuller - backing vocals       
 Alvin Stoller - drums
 Jeff Porcaro - drums 
 Frank Capp - drums 
 Vinnie Colaiuta - drums
 Harvey Mason Sr. - drums    
 Chuck Berghofer - bass guitar
 Chuck Domanico - bass
 Dennis Budimir - guitar
 John Goux - guitar
 Steve Lukather - guitar  
 Robbie Buchanan - keyboards, programming
 Marc Shaiman - keyboards
 Dave Grusin - keyboards
 Randy Kerber - keyboards 
 Michael Lang - keyboards 
 Claude Gaudette - synthesizer, keyboards
 Joe Mardin - synthesizer, keyboards, programming
 Eric Persing - programming
 Jack Sheldon - trumpet  
 Stuart Canin - concert master 
 Gerald Vinci - concert master

Production

 Arif Mardin - record producer, musical arranger, string arrangements, woodwind arrangements 
 Dave Grusin - producer, rhythm arrangements
 Joe Mardin - producer, arranger 
 Marc Shaiman - arranger, conductor, producer, vocal arrangement
 Joel Sill - executive producer
 Artie Kane - conductor
 Ralph Burns - arranger, conductor
 Marty Paich - arranger, conductor
 Billy May - arranger, conductor  
 Robbie Buchanan - rhythm arrangements 
 Morgan Ames - vocal arrangements
 Lorraine Feather - vocal arrangements
 Jack Joseph Puig - engineer
 Joey Wolpert - engineer
 Bob Schaper - engineer
 Don Murray - engineer, mixing 
 Michael O'Reilly - engineer, mixing  
 Ray Blair - assistant engineer
 Brett Swain - assistant engineer
 Eddie Sexton - assistant engineer
 Eric Rudd - assistant engineer
 Marnie Riley - assistant engineer
 Mark Guilbeault - assistant engineer
 Charles Paakkari - assistant engineer   
 Doug Sax - mastering
 Sandy DeCrescent - music contractor
 Lisa Maldonado - production coordination
 Recorded at Capitol Studios, Studio 55, Oceanway Recording, and Conway Recording Studios, Los Angeles, California.

Charts

Certifications

References

Bette Midler soundtracks
1991 soundtrack albums
Albums arranged by Marty Paich
Albums produced by Arif Mardin
1990s film soundtrack albums
Atlantic Records soundtracks
Comedy film soundtracks
Musical film soundtracks
Drama film soundtracks